Mizuho Umemura (born September 10, 1978, in Aichi Prefecture, Japan) is a Japanese politician who has served as a member of the House of Councillors of Japan since 2019. She represents the Osaka district and is a member of the Nippon Ishin no Kai (Japan Innovation Party).

References 

1978 births
Living people
21st-century Japanese politicians
Politicians from Aichi Prefecture
Female members of the House of Councillors (Japan)
Nippon Ishin no Kai politicians
21st-century Japanese women politicians